The Syracuse Stars were an American baseball team which played one season in the American Association in . They were based in Syracuse, New York, and played their games at Star Park.

Starting out in the minor leagues

Moving up to the majors
The Stars joined the American Association for the 1890 season. The Stars of 1890 won 55 games and lost 72 to finish seventh in the nine-team league. They were managed for most of the season by owner George Frazier.  Wallace Fessenden took over as manager for the last eleven games.

The Stars' top hitter was second baseman Cupid Childs, who led the team in games played (126), hits (170), doubles (33), triples (14), runs (109), runs batted in (89), batting average (.345), on-base percentage (.434), slugging percentage (.481), and stolen bases (56).  Their best pitcher was Dan Casey, who was 19-22 with a 4.14 ERA.  Ed Mars was 9-5 to lead the team in winning percentage (.643) even though he had a higher ERA (4.67).

The Stars folded after the 1890 season during which owner Frazier lost an estimated $21,000 on the team.

See also
 Syracuse Stars (minor league baseball)
 1890 Syracuse Stars season

References

Notes

Bibliography 
Nemec, David, (2004), The Beer and Whisky League: The Illustrated History of the American Association—Baseball's Renegade Major League, The Lyons Press.

External links

Baseball Reference Team Index for the 1890 Stars

American Association (1882–1891) baseball teams
Defunct baseball teams in New York (state)
American Association
Baseball teams disestablished in 1890
Baseball teams established in 1885